Llithfaen is a Village on the Northern Coast of the Llŷn Peninsula in Gwynedd, Wales, in the historic county of Caernarfonshire. There is a Shop, Pub, Playground, Community Hall located in the Village Centre. Llithfaen has 83% Welsh Speakers in the 2021 UK Census. The Population of Llithfaen is 1,113 in 2021 Census. There is a River called Afon Erch running from Llithfaen to the Small Village of Abererch. Nearby Yr Eifl can be seen far as the Isle of Man, Wicklow Mountains, Cardigan Bay, Caernarfon Bay, and possibly the Lake District. Llithfaen is in the Community of a Small Village of Pistyll. The village of Trefor is nearby. Pwllheli is the nearest town, approximately 9 miles (13 km) away and the town of Caernarfon is 15 miles (24 km) away Nant Gwrtheyrn is a Welsh Language Heritage Centre near the village. The nearest beach is Trefor Beach. Llithfaen is near Caernarfon Bay and the Irish Sea.

Governance 
The area is in the Senedd constituency of Dwyfor Meirionydd and the Westminster constituency of the same name.

References

Villages in Gwynedd
Pistyll